Maltodextrin is a polysaccharide that is used as a food ingredient. It is produced from vegetable starch by partial hydrolysis and is usually found as a white hygroscopic spray-dried powder. Maltodextrin is easily digestible, being absorbed as rapidly as glucose and may be either moderately sweet or almost flavorless (depending on the degree of polymerisation). It can be found as an ingredient in a variety of processed foods.

Structure
Maltodextrin consists of D-glucose units connected in chains of variable length. The glucose units are primarily linked with α(1→4) glycosidic bonds, like that seen in the linear derivative of glycogen (after the removal of α1,6- branching). Maltodextrin is typically composed of a mixture of chains that vary from three to 17 glucose units long.

Maltodextrins are classified by DE (dextrose equivalent) and have a DE between 3 and 20. The higher the DE value, the shorter the glucose chains, the higher the sweetness, the higher the solubility, and the lower the heat resistance. Above DE 20, the European Union's CN code calls it glucose syrup; at DE 10 or lower the customs CN code nomenclature classifies maltodextrins as dextrins.

Production
Maltodextrin can be enzymatically derived from any starch. In the US, this starch is usually corn (maize); in Europe, it is common to use wheat. In the European Union, wheat-derived maltodextrin is exempt from wheat allergen labeling, as set out in Annex II of EC Regulation No 1169/2011. In the United States, however, it is not exempt from allergen declaration per the Food Allergen Labeling and Consumer Protection Act, and its effect on a voluntary gluten-free claim must be evaluated on a case-by-case basis per the applicable Food and Drug Administration policy.

Food uses
Maltodextrin is used to improve the texture and mouthfeel of food and beverage products, such as potato chips and "light" peanut butter to reduce the fat content. Maltodextrin may be taken as a dietary supplement in powder form, gel packets, or energy drinks. It is also used as a substitute for lactose.

It is also used as a filler in sugar substitutes and other products. Maltodextrin has a glycemic index ranging from 85 to 119, higher than table sugar.

Other uses
Maltodextrin is used as a horticultural insecticide both in the field and in greenhouses. It has no biochemical action. Its efficacy is based upon spraying a dilute solution upon the pest insects, whereupon the solution dries, blocks the insects' spiracles and causes death by asphyxiation.

See also
 Icodextrin
 Maltose
 Maltotriose

References

External links

Oligosaccharides
Sports nutrition
Starch
Sweeteners